Don't Worry may refer to:

 "Don't Worry" (Chingy song), with Janet Jackson
 "Don't Worry" (Kim Appleby song)
 "Don't Worry" (Modern Talking song), from Modern Talking's 1987 album "Romantic Warriors"
 "Don't Worry" (Appleton song)
 "Don't Worry" (Marty Robbins song)
 "Don't Worry" (Madcon song), a 2015 song by Madcon featuring Ray Dalton
 "Don't Worry" (Ace Wilder song), a 2016 song by Ace Wilder
 "Don't Worry", a song by The Game featuring Mary J. Blige, from the album The Documentary
 "Don't Worry", a song by Rebecca St. James from Transform
 "Don't Worry", a song by Aaliyah from I Care 4 U
 "Don't Worry"
 "Don't Worry" an album by electronic rock band Math the Band

See also
 Don't Worry Club, founded by Theodore Frelinghuysen Seward
 Don't Worry, Be Happy (disambiguation)
 "Don't Worry 'bout Me Baby", a country song by Janie Fricke
 "Three Little Birds", a song by Bob Marley & The Wailers often wrongly assumed to have “don't worry” in the title